Relate is a British charity providing relationship support.

Relate may also refer to:

"Relate" (song), a 2021 song by For King & Country
Relate, a 2013 album by Neon Highwire
Relate Institute, a department of Doncaster College, South Yorkshire, England

See also
Relation (disambiguation)